North Yorkshire may refer to:
 North Yorkshire, the largest ceremonial county in England
 North Riding of Yorkshire, a historic subdivision, region and former county in Yorkshire

Politics
 North Yorkshire County Council, Non-metropolitan county council covering parts of North Yorkshire
 North Yorkshire Council, future district council covering parts of North Yorkshire
 Yorkshire North (European Parliament constituency), a constituency from 1979 to 1984
 North Yorkshire (European Parliament constituency), a constituency from 1994 to 1999
 North Riding County Council, former Administrative county council
 Yorkshire North Riding (UK Parliament constituency), a constituency from 1832 to 1835

Sport
North Riding County Football Association, founded in 1881
North Riding Senior Cup
 North Riding Football League, association football league founded in 2017
 Yorkshire Premier League North, cricket league formed in 2016
 North Yorkshire and South Durham Cricket League, founded in 1892 and ECB Premier League since 2012

Other
North York Moors, a national park established in 1952
North Yorkshire Moors Railway, heritage railway